.mx is the Internet country code top-level domain (ccTLD) for Mexico, which in 2009 was re-opened to new registrations by NIC México. In 2009, the .mx ccTLD was rolled out in three steps:
 Sunrise period from 1 May to 31 July 2009, waiting period, registrants who have already registered any other .MX second-level domain were able to register their domain for one year
 Waiting period from 1 August to 31 August 2009, to set up the domains registered in the Sunrise period, and to resolve domain name disputes
 Initial registration period from 1 September to 31 October 2009; in this part the registration will be done with the policy first-come, first-served and only for one year with a special set of prices.

After the three phases, .mx registrations was opened to the public.

Second-level domains
Up to August 2009 domain registrations besides .MX, consist of third-level names beneath second-level names which parallel some of the top-level domains:

 .com.mx: Commercial entities (actually unrestricted, like .com)
 .net.mx: Network providers (registration limited to qualifying entities)
 .org.mx: Non-profit organizations (registration limited to qualifying entities)
 .ngo.mx: Non-profit organizations or Civil society organizations (registration NOT limited to qualifying entities)
 .edu.mx: Educational institutions (registration limited to qualifying entities)
 .gob.mx: Federal, State or Municipal Governmental entities only (.gob derives from the Spanish word for government: "Gobierno")

Currently second level domains can be registered directly under .mx.

On 30 April 2009, second level domain registrations were 0.06% of the total. A month later the value was up to 4.9% On 30 April 2010, second level registrations were 21.4% of the total.

See also

Internet in Mexico

References

External links
 IANA .mx whois information
 Official .MX Registry site

Country code top-level domains
Computer-related introductions in 1989
Internet in Mexico

sv:Toppdomän#M